A melanger (or melangeur, from French: mélangeur, lit. "blender") is a stone-grinder that is used in chocolate-making. It typically consists of two granite wheels, which rotate inside a metal drum on top of a granite base. Given enough time the wheels can reduce the particles to sizes measured in microns, therefore making a smooth chocolate paste from cocoa beans.

Stone grinding tools have been widely used in history to make food. In Mesoamerica, cocoa was ground using a metate. Industrialization in the late 18th century favored the use of larger and water powered machines. Philippe Suchard is generally credited for the introduction of the first modern melanger in 1826. He opened a chocolate factory in Neuchâtel where he used a melanger to grind cocoa and sugar.

Nowadays melangers tend to be used by small chocolate manufacturers only. Melangers can be both used as refiners and conches.

Tabletop wet grinders are smaller versions of the melanger.

See also
Bean-to-bar

References

Chocolate
Swiss inventions
Food preparation appliances